Major-General Henry Gabriel Woods,  (7 May 1924 – 19 September 2019) was a British Army officer.

Military career
Educated at Highgate School and Trinity College, Oxford, Woods was commissioned into the 5th Royal Inniskilling Dragoon Guards in 1944 and served in North West Europe during the Second World War. He also saw action during the Korean War. He became commanding officer of the 5th Royal Inniskilling Dragoon Guards in 1965. He went on to be Commandant, Royal Armoured Corps Centre in 1969, British Military Attaché in Washington, D.C. in 1973 and General Officer Commanding North East District in 1976. Woods was appointed a Companion of the Order of the Bath in the 1979 Birthday Honours.

Personal life
Woods married Imogen Elizabeth Birchenough Dodd in 1953; they had two daughters.

He died on 19 September 2019 at the age of 95.

References

 

1924 births
2019 deaths
5th Royal Inniskilling Dragoon Guards officers
Alumni of Trinity College, Oxford
British Army personnel of World War II
Companions of the Order of the Bath
British Army generals
Members of the Order of the British Empire
Members of the Royal Victorian Order
People educated at Highgate School
Recipients of the Military Cross
British Army personnel of the Korean War